Four vessels have served the British Royal Navy under the name Marianne, though it is not clear that all were commissioned.

Marianne was a storeship purchased in 1788 and listed until 1793.
Marianne was the French transport Marianne of 12 guns. The French Navy acquired her in 1798 and the squadron of Commodore Sir Sidney Smith captured her off Syria on 1 March 1799, The French recaptured her in March, but the British recaptured her in November. She was sold in September 1801.
Marianne was a Spanish 10-gun schooner that  captured in 1805 and used as a ship's tender. She was still listed in 1806.
Marianne was a slave ship of 460 tons (bm)  and  captured on 22 March 1858, and that the Navy purchased in 1859. From 1860 she served at Jamaica as a receiving ship and lazaretto. In February 1864 she was ordered broken up, and she was broken up in 1867.

Citations and references
Citations

References

Royal Navy ship names